Act II is an American brand of microwave popcorn that is ostensibly based on the look and taste of movie theater popcorn.  It is currently made and distributed by Conagra Brands. Act II was preceded in the popcorn market by Act I, an early microwave popcorn that had to be stored in the refrigerator due to its real butter content. Act I was introduced in 1981. In 1984, Act II, a shelf stable microwave popcorn was released, becoming the first mass-marketed microwave popcorn.

Act II was manufactured by the Golden Valley Microwave Foods (frequently abbreviated as GVMF on the packaging) company of Edina, Minnesota. GVMF was later bought by ConAgra Foods in 1991.

The Edina facility was closed and manufacturing moved to other manufacturing plants in the US and Mexico.

The popcorn bag used in Act II was invented by James Watkins, a former engineer for the Pillsbury Company in Minneapolis, MN and then Founder/President of Golden Valley Microwave Foods.

See also

 List of popcorn brands

References

External links
Act II - Brand website

Popcorn brands
Conagra Brands brands
Products introduced in 1981